Coprolalia is the fourth EP released by You Am I, in April 1993. A film clip was made for "Last Thing You Can Depend On".

Track listing 
All songs: Rogers/You Am I

 "Cool Hand Luke"
 "Last Thing You Can Depend On"
 "Can't Get Started"
 "In Case You're Wandering"
 "Embarrassed"

Personnel

 Tim Rogers - vocals, guitar
 Andy Kent - bass, backing vocals
 Mark Tunaley - drums

1993 EPs
You Am I albums